The Grenada women's national football team is the national women's football team of Grenada and is overseen by the Grenada Football Association.

Results and fixtures

The following is a list of match results in the last 12 months, as well as any future matches that have been scheduled.

Legend

2022

Players

Current squad
 The following players were called-up for the match against Bermuda on 12 April 2022.

Recent call ups

Competitive record

FIFA Women's World Cup

*Draws include knockout matches decided on penalty kicks.

Olympic Games

*Draws include knockout matches decided on penalty kicks.

CONCACAF W Championship

*Draws include knockout matches decided on penalty kicks.

References

External links
FIFA Team Profile
Grenada Football Association official website

 
Caribbean women's national association football teams